El hombre de alazán ("The Man of Chestnut") is a 1959 Mexican film. It was written by Luis Alcoriza.

External links
 

1959 films
Mexican comedy-drama films
1950s Spanish-language films
1950s Mexican films